Giorgio Napolitano (born 29 June 1925) is an Italian politician who served as president of Italy from 2006 to 2015, the first Italian president to be re-elected to the presidency. Due to his dominant position in Italian politics, some critics have sometimes referred to him as Re Giorgio ("King Giorgio"). In office from 2006 to 2015, he is the longest-serving and longest-lived president in the history of the modern Italian Republic, which has been in existence since 1946.

Napolitano was a longtime member of the Italian Communist Party and of its post-Communist social democratic successors, from the Democratic Party of the Left onwards. He was a leading member of a modernizing faction on the right of the party. First elected to the Chamber of Deputies in 1953, he took an assiduous interest in parliamentary life and was President of the Chamber of Deputies from 1992 to 1994. He was Minister of the Interior from 1996 to 1998 under Romano Prodi.

Napolitano was appointed a Senator for life in 2005 by President Carlo Azeglio Ciampi. In May 2006, he was elected by Parliament as President of Italy. During his first term of office, he oversaw governments both of the centre-left, led by Prodi, and the centre-right, led by Silvio Berlusconi. In November 2011, Berlusconi resigned as Prime Minister amid financial and economic problems.  Napolitano, in keeping with his constitutional role, then asked former EU commissioner Mario Monti to form a cabinet which was referred to as a "government of the president" by critics.

When his seven-year presidential term expired in April 2013, Napolitano (then aged 87) reluctantly accepted re-election, becoming the first President of Italy to serve a second term, to safeguard the continuity of the country's institutions during the parliamentary deadlock that followed the 2013 general election. On being reelected as President with broad cross-party support in Parliament, he overcame the impasse by inviting Enrico Letta to propose a government in the form of a grand coalition. When Letta handed in his resignation on 14 February 2014, Napolitano mandated Matteo Renzi (Letta's factional challenger) to form a new government. After a record eight and a half years as President, Napolitano resigned at age 89 in January 2015.

Napolitano was often accused by his critics of having transformed a largely ceremonial role into a political and executive one, becoming, during the years of his tenure, the real kingmaker of Italian politics. As of 2022, Napolitano is currently the only living former Italian President.

Early life 
Napolitano was born in Naples, in 1925. His father Giovanni was a liberal lawyer and poet, while his mother was Carolina Bobbio, a descendant of a noble Piedmontese family. From 1938 to 1941, he studied at the Classical Lyceum Umberto I of Naples, but in 1941 his family moved to Padova and he was graduated to the lyceum Titus Livius.  In 1942, he matriculated at the University of Naples Federico II, studying law.  During this period, Napolitano adhered to the local University Fascist Youth ("Gioventù Universitaria Fascista"), where he met his core group of friends, who shared his opposition to Italian Fascism.  As he would later state, the group "was in fact a true breeding ground of anti-fascist intellectual energies, disguised and to a certain extent tolerated".

An enthusiast of the theatre since secondary school, during his university years he contributed a theatrical review to the IX Maggio weekly magazine and had small parts in plays organized by the Gioventù Universitaria Fascista itself.  He played in a comedy by Salvatore Di Giacomo at Teatro Mercadante in Naples.  Napolitano dreamt of being an actor and spent his early years performing in several productions at the Teatro Mercadante.

Napolitano has often been cited as the author of a collection of sonnets in Neapolitan dialect published under a pseudonym, Tommaso Pignatelli, and entitled Pe cupià ’o chiarfo ("To mimic the downpour").  He denied this in 1997 and, again, on the occasion of his presidential election, when his staff described the attribution of authorship to Napolitano as a "journalistic myth".  He published his first acknowledged book, entitled Movimento Operaio e Industria di Stato (which can be translated as "Workers' Movement and State Industry"), in 1962.

World War II 
During the existence of the Italian Social Republic (1943–1945), a puppet state of Nazi Germany in the final period of World War II, Napolitano and his circle of friends took part in several actions of the Italian resistance movement against German and Italian fascist forces.

Early political career

From post-war years to the Hungarian Revolution of 1956 
In 1944, along with the group of Neapolitan Communists, as Mario Palermo and Maurizio Valenzi, Napolitano prepared the arrival in Naples of Palmiro Togliatti, the long-time leader of the Italian Communist Party who was in exile since 1926 when the Communist Party of Italy was banned by the Italian Fascist government, and Togliatti was one of few leaders not to be arrested, as he was attending a meeting of the Comintern in Moscow.

Following the end of the war in 1945, Napolitano joined the Italian Communist Party (PCI) and became its federal secretary for Naples and Caserta. In 1947, he graduated in jurisprudence with a final dissertation on political economy, entitled Il mancato sviluppo industriale del Mezzogiorno dopo l'unità e la legge speciale per Napoli del 1904 ("The lack of industrial development in the Mezzogiorno following the unification of Italy and the special law of 1904 for Naples"). He became a member of the Secretariat of the Italian Economic Centre for Southern Italy in 1946, which was represented by Senator Paratore, where he remained for two years. Napolitano played a major role in the Movement for the Rebirth of Southern Italy for over ten years.

Napolitano was first elected to the Chamber of Deputies in 1953 for the electoral district of Naples, and was reelected in every election until 1996. He was elected to the National Committee of the party during its eighth national congress in 1956, largely thanks to the support offered by Palmiro Togliatti, who wanted to involve younger politicians in the central direction of the party. He became responsible for the commission for Southern Italy within the National Committee.

In 1953 a document of the Italian Ministry of Interior reported Napolitano as a member of the secret armed paramilitary groups of the Communist Party in the city of Rome (so-called "Gladio Rossa").

Later on in the same year, the Hungarian Revolution of 1956 and its military suppression by the Soviet Union occurred. The leadership of the Italian Communist Party labelled the insurgents as counter-revolutionaries, and the official party newspaper L'Unità referred to them as "thugs" and "despicable agents provocateurs". Napolitano complied with the party-sponsored position on this matter, a choice he would repeatedly declare to have become uncomfortable with, developing what his autobiography describes as a "grievous self-critical torment". He would reason that his compliance was motivated by concerns about the role of the Italian Communist Party as "inseparable from the fates of the socialist forces guided by the USSR" as opposed to "imperialist" forces.

The decision to support the USSR against the Hungarian revolutionaries generated a split in the PCI, and even the CGIL (Italy's largest trade union, then supportive of the PCI) refused to conform to the party-sponsored position and applauded the revolution, on the basis that the eighth national congress of the Italian Communist Party had indeed stated that the "Italian way to socialism" was to be democratic and specific to the nation. These views were supported in the party by Giorgio Amendola, whom Napolitano would always look up to as a teacher. Frequently seen together, Giorgio Amendola and Giorgio Napolitano would jokingly be referred to by friends as (respectively) Giorgio 'o chiatto and Giorgio 'o sicco ("Giorgio the pudgy" and "Giorgio the slim" in the Neapolitan dialect).

Leading member of the Italian Communist Party

From the 1960s to 1980s 

Between 1963 and 1966, Napolitano was party chairman in the city of Naples and later, between 1966 and 1969, he was appointed as chairman of the secretary's office and of the political office. In 1964, following the death of Palmiro Togliatti, Napolitano was one of the main leaders who supported an alliance with the Italian Socialist Party, which after the end of the Popular Democratic Front joined the government with the Christian Democracy). During the 1970s and 1980s, Napolitano was in charge for cultural activities, economic policy and the international relations of the party.

Napolitano's political thought was somewhat moderate in the context of the PCI: in fact, he became the leader of the wing of the party called Migliorismo, whose members notably included Gerardo Chiaromonte and Emanuele Macaluso. The term migliorista (from migliore, Italian for "better") was coined with a slightly mocking intent. To be a betterist was regarded more negatively than to be a reformist by traditional Communists.

In the mid-1970s, Napolitano was invited by the Massachusetts Institute of Technology to give a lecture, but the United States ambassador to Italy, John A. Volpe, refused to grant Napolitano a visa on account of his membership of the PCI. Between 1977 and 1981 Napolitano had some secret meetings with the United States ambassador Richard Gardner, at a time when the PCI was seeking contact with the US administration, in the context of its definitive break with its past relationship with the Communist Party of the Soviet Union and the beginning of eurocommunism, the attempt to develop a theory and practice more adapted to the democratic countries of Western Europe. He was an active member of the party until it ended in 1991. In 2006, when Napolitano was elected President of the Italian Republic, Gardner stated to AP Television News that he considered Napolitano "a real statesman", "a true believer in democracy" and "a friend of the United States [who] will carry out his office with impartiality and fairness".

Thanks to this role and in part by the good offices of Giulio Andreotti, in the 1980s Napolitano was able to travel to the United States and give lectures at Aspen, Colorado and at Harvard University. He has since visited and lectured in the United States several times. After the death of Enrico Berlinguer in 1984, Napolitano was among the possible successors as Secretary of the party, but Alessandro Natta was preferred. In July 1989 Napolitano became Foreign Minister in the PCI shadow government, from which he resigned the day after the Congress of Rimini, where advocates for processing into Democratic Party of the Left.

After the Italian Communist Party 

After the dissolution of the PCI in February 1991, Napolitano followed most of its membership into the Democratic Party of the Left, a democratic socialist  and social democratic party, considered the post-communist evolution of the PCI.

President of the Chamber of Deputies 
In 1992 he was elected President of the Chamber of Deputies, replacing Oscar Luigi Scalfaro, who became President of the Italian Republic. That legislature was hit by "Tangentopoli" and his presidency became one of the fronts of the relationship between the judiciary and politics.

Late 1990s and early 2000s 
After the 1996 Italian general election, the centre-left Prime Minister Romano Prodi selected him as Minister of the Interior. He was the first former Communist to hold the office, a role traditionally occupied by Christian Democrats. In this capacity, he took part, together with fellow lawmaker and Cabinet Minister Livia Turco, in drafting the government-sponsored law on immigration control (Legislative Decree No. 40 6 March 1998), better known as the "Turco–Napolitano bill". Napolitano remained Minister of the Interior until October 1998, when Prodi's government lost its majority in the Parliament.

Napolitano also served a second term as an MEP from 1999 to 2004 as member of the Party of European Socialists. In October 2005, he was named Senator for life, and was, therefore, one of the last two to be appointed by President of the Republic Carlo Azeglio Ciampi, together with Sergio Pininfarina.

President of Italy

First term (2006–2013)

Election 

The 2006 Italian general election saw a victory of the centre-left candidate Romano Prodi against the incumbent conservative Prime Minister Silvio Berlusconi. After the election, the Presidents of both houses of parliament were chosen by the winning centre-left coalition, and so the centre-right House of Freedoms demanded an impartial candidate for the role of President of the Republic. The Union stressed the fact that the Italian Constitution demands that the President be a defender of the constitution, hinting that such a quality was scarce among the opposition members.

Berlusconi was the most vocal opponent of any candidate that came from the former Italian Communist Party, in line with the anti-communist stance he had taken in the campaign. His allies, especially the Union of Christian and Centre Democrats (UDC), openly disagreed with his intransigence but vowed to stick with their ally's decision. Yet, when Napolitano was elected, Silvio Berlusconi gave an interview to one of his political magazines Panorama saying that the UDC betrayed him by letting 60 of his electors cast a blank vote on the first ballot, instead of supporting the official candidate Gianni Letta. When the UDC argued that this might have spelt the end of the Coalition, Silvio Berlusconi quickly changed his stance by saying, as he often had, that he had been "misunderstood" and that he never gave that journalist an interview.

The candidacy of Massimo D'Alema was supported by his party, the Democrats of the Left, and by other parties of the coalition, such as the Party of Italian Communists, the Communist Refoundation Party and Democracy is Freedom – The Daisy, but opposed by others, such as the Rose in the Fist, arguing that his candidacy was driven by a particracy's mentality. Also, part of the left-wing coalition considered D'Alema far too willing to conduct backroom deals with the opposition. Some moderate journalists liked D'Alema because his presidency would have given Romano Prodi a stable government since the biggest party of the Union had not been rewarded with any institutional position.

In the opposition coalition, while Silvio Berlusconi vehemently opposed a D'Alema presidency, some of his aides, such as Marcello Dell'Utri, and some aligned newspapers, such as Il Foglio, campaigned for D'Alema. However, the official stance of the centre-right was that D'Alema, being an important left-wing politician and having participated in the election campaign, was ill-suited for president, a role that it is supposed to be impartial.

However, when The Union proposed Giorgio Napolitano, the House of Freedom objected that the Union should have presented a list of names. Even though Napolitano appeared at first a candidate that the House of Freedoms could converge on, the proposal was rejected much like that of D'Alema.

The centre-left majority coalition, on 7 May 2006, officially endorsed Napolitano as its candidate in the presidential election that began on 8 May. The Vatican endorsed him as President through its official newspaper, L'Osservatore Romano, just after The Union named him as its candidate, as did Marco Follini, former secretary of the Union of Christian and Centre Democrats, a member party of the House of Freedoms.

Napolitano was elected on 10 May, in the fourth round of voting — the first of those requiring only an absolute majority, unlike the first three which required two-thirds of the votes — with 543 votes (out of a possible 1009).  At the age of 80, he became the first former Communist to become President of Italy, as well as the third Neapolitan after Enrico De Nicola and Giovanni Leone. He came out of retirement to accept. After his election, expressions of esteem toward him personally as regarding his authoritative character as future President of the Italian Republic were made by both members of The Union and of the House of Freedoms (which had turned in blank votes), such as Pier Ferdinando Casini. Nevertheless, some Italian right-wing newspapers, such as il Giornale, expressed concerns about his communist past. He started his term on 15 May.

Prodi Cabinet 
On 9 July 2006, Napolitano was present at the FIFA World Cup final, in which the Italian team defeated France and won its fourth World Cup, and afterwards he joined the players' celebrations. He is the second President of the Italian Republic to be present at a FIFA World Cup final won by the Italian team, after Sandro Pertini in 1982.

On 26 September 2006, Napolitano made an official visit to Budapest, Hungary, where he paid tribute to the fallen in the 1956 revolution, which he initially opposed as member of the Italian Communist Party, by laying a wreath at Imre Nagy's grave.

On 10 February 2007 a diplomatic crisis arose between Italy and Croatia after President Napolitano made an official speech during the celebration of the National Memorial Day of the Exiles and Foibe in which he stated:

The European Commission did not comment on this event, but did comment on (and partly condemn) the response by Croatian president Stjepan Mesić, who described Napolitano's statement as racist because Napolitano did not refer to either Slovenians or Croatians as a nation when he spoke about a "Slavic annexationist design" for the Julian March (at the time, Slovenians and Croatians fought together in the Yugoslav Resistance Movement). Another matter of debate in Croatia was that the Italian President made awards to relatives of 25 foibe victims, who included the last fascist Italian prefect in Zadar, Vincenzo Serrentino, who was sentenced to death in 1947 in Šibenik. That was seen by Mesić as "historic revisionism" and open support for revanchism. President Napolitano's remarks on the foibe massacres were praised by both centre-left and centre-right in Italy, and both coalitions condemned Mesić's statements, while the whole of Croatia stood by Mesić, who later acknowledged that Napolitano didn't want to put in discussion the Peace Treaty of 1947.

On 21 February 2007, Prime Minister Romano Prodi submitted his resignation after losing a foreign policy vote in the Parliament; Napolitano held talks with the political groups in parliament, and on 24 February rejected the resignation, prompting Prodi to ask for a new vote of confidence. Prodi won the vote in the upper house on 28 February and in the lower house on 2 March, allowing his cabinet to remain in office.

2008 political crisis 

On 24 January 2008, Romano Prodi lost a vote of confidence in the Senate by a vote of 161 to 156 votes, after the UDEUR Populars ended its support for the Prodi-led government.

On 30 January, Napolitano appointed the President of the Senate Franco Marini to try to form a caretaker government with the goal of changing the current electoral system, rather than call a quick election. The state of the electoral system had been under criticism not only within the outgoing government, but also among the opposition and in the general population, because of the impossibility to choose candidates directly and of the risks that a close-call election might not grant a stable majority in the Senate.

After Marini was given the mandate, two politicians (Bruno Tabacci and Mario Baccini) splintered from the Union of Christian and Centre Democrats to form the White Rose, while two leading members of the Forza Italia faction Liberal-Popular Union (Ferdinando Adornato and [Angelo Sanza) switched allegiance to the UDC. On 4 February, the Liberal Populars (a UDC faction which favoured merging with Forza Italia) seceded from UDC to join Berlusconi's People of Freedom later this year.

On 4 February 2008, Marini acknowledged that he had failed to find the necessary majority for an interim government, and resigned his mandate, after having met with all major political forces and having found opposition to forming an interim government mainly from center-right parties Forza Italia and National Alliance, favoured in a possible next election and strongly in favour of an early vote.

President Napolitano summoned Bertinotti and Marini, the two Speakers of the Houses of the Italian Parliament, acknowledging the end of the legislature, on 5 February 2008. He dissolved the Parliament on 6 February 2008. Snap elections were held on 13 and 14 April 2008 together with the administrative elections. The elections resulted in a decisive victory for Berlusconi's centre-right coalition.

On 7 May 2008, President Napolitano appointed Silvio Berlusconi as Prime Minister, following his landslide victory in the general election. The cabinet was officially inaugurated one day later, with Berlusconi thus becoming the second Prime Minister under President Napolitano.

Eluana Englaro incident 
On 6 February 2009, President Napolitano refused to sign an emergency decree made by the Berlusconi government in order to suspend a final court sentence allowing suspension of nutrition to 38-year-old coma patient Eluana Englaro; the decree could not be enacted by Berlusconi. This caused a major political debate within Italy regarding the relationship between the President and the government in office.

2011 political crisis 

On 11 October 2011, the Chamber of Deputies rejected the law on the budget of the State proposed by the government. As a result of this event Berlusconi moved for a confidence vote in the Chamber on 14 October, he won the vote with just 316 votes to 310, minimum required to retain a majority. An increasing number of Deputies continued to cross the floor and join the opposition and on 8 November the Chamber approved the law on the budget of the State previously rejected but with only 308 votes, while opposition parties did not participate in the vote to highlight that Berlusconi had lost his majority. After the vote, Berlusconi announced his resignation after Parliament passed economic reforms.

On 12 November 2011, after a final meeting with his cabinet, Berlusconi met Napolitano at the Quirinal Palace to tend his resignation. As he arrived at the presidential residence, a hostile crowd gathered with banners shouting insults at Berlusconi and throwing coins at the car. After his resignation, the booing and jeering continued as he left in his convoy, with the public shouting words such as "buffoon", "dictator" and "mafioso". Following Berlusconi's resignation, President Napolitano then decided to appoint former EU Commissioner Mario Monti as a Senator for Life, and then as Prime Minister-designate. The Monti Cabinet was subsequently confirmed by an overwhelming majority of both houses of the Italian parliament, in what was widely referred to as a "government of the President".

Napolitano's management of the events caused unprecedented worldwide media exposure regarding his role as President of the Italian Republic, a role normally regarded as largely ceremonial.

Second term (2013–2015)

Re-election 

Following five inconclusive ballots for the 2013 Italian presidential election, Napolitano accepted to be re-elected as President – an unprecedented move – following pleas by Prime Minister Mario Monti and the leaders of the main political blocks, Pier Luigi Bersani and Silvio Berlusconi.

Napolitano reluctantly agreed to serve for another term in order to safeguard the continuity of the country's institutions.

Napolitano was easily re-elected on 20 April 2013, receiving 738 of the 1007 possible votes, and was sworn in on 22 April 2013 after a speech when he asked for constitutional and electoral reforms.

Letta Cabinet 

After his re-election, Napolitano immediately began consultations with the chairmen of the Chamber of Deputies, Senate and political forces, after the failure of the previous attempt with Pier Luigi Bersani after the elections, and the establishment of a panel of experts by the President himself (dubbed as wise men by the press), in order to outline priorities and formulate an agenda to deal with the persistent economic hardship and growing unemployment.

On 24 April 2013, Napolitano gave to the vice-secretary of the Democratic Party, Enrico Letta, the task of forming a government, having determined that Pier Luigi Bersani, leader of the winning coalition Italy Common Good, could not form a government because it did not have a majority in the Senate. On 27 April Letta formally accepted the task of leading a Grand coalition government, with support from the centre-left Democratic Party (of which he stays Deputy Secretary), the centre-right People of Freedom, and the centrist Civic Choice, and subsequently listed the members of the Letta Cabinet. The government he formed became the first in the history of the Italian Republic to include representatives of all the major candidate-coalitions that had competed in the election. His close relationship with his uncle Gianni Letta, one of Silvio Berlusconi's most trusted advisors, was perceived as a way of overcoming the bitter hostility between the two opposing camps. Letta appointed Angelino Alfano, secretary of the People of Freedom, as his Deputy Prime Minister. Letta was formally sworn-in as Prime Minister on 28 April; during the ceremony, a man fired shots outside Palazzo Chigi and wounded two Carabinieri.

Renzi Cabinet 
In the 2013 Democratic Party leadership election, Matteo Renzi, the young mayor of Florence, was elected with 68% of the popular vote, compared to 18% for Gianni Cuperlo and 14% for Giuseppe Civati. He became the new Secretary of the Democratic Party and the centre-left's prospective candidate for Prime Minister. His victory was welcomed by Prime Minister Enrico Letta, who had been the Vice Secretary of the party under Bersani's leadership.

In an earlier speech, Renzi had paid tribute to Letta, saying that he was not intended to put him "on trial". Without directly proposing himself as the next Prime Minister, he said the Eurozone's third-largest economy urgently needed "a new phase" and "radical programme" to push through badly-needed reforms. The motion he put forward made clear "the necessity and urgency of opening a new phase with a new executive". Speaking privately to party leaders, Renzi said that Italy was "at a crossroads" and faced either holding fresh elections or a new government without a return to the polls. On 14 February, President Napolitano accepted Letta's resignation from the office of Prime Minister.

Following Letta's resignation, Renzi formally received the task of forming the new Italian government from President Napolitano on 17 February. Renzi held several days of talks with party leaders, all of which he broadcast live on the internet, before unveiling his Cabinet on 21 February, which contained members of his Democratic Party, the New Centre-Right, the Union of the Centre and the Civic Choice. His Cabinet became Italy's youngest government to date, with an average age of 47. It was also the first in which the number of female Ministers was equal to the number of male Ministers, excluding the Prime Minister.

The following day, Renzi was formally sworn in as Prime Minister, becoming the fourth Prime Minister in four years and the youngest Prime Minister in the history of Italy, and the Renzi Cabinet was established.

On 30 January 2014, the Five Star Movement deposited an impeachment accusing Napolitano of harming the Italian Constitution, to allow unconstitutional laws and in relation to the State-Mafia Pact. The motion was later dismissed.

Resignation 
On 9 November 2014, the Italian press reported that Napolitano would step down at the end of the year. The press office of the Quirinale "neither confirmed nor denied" the reports. Napolitano officially resigned on 14 January 2015, after the end of the six-month Italian presidency of the EU.

After the presidency 
As an Emeritus President of Italy, Napolitano became Senator for life after the end of his presidency on 14 January 2015. On 19 January 2015 he joined the For the Autonomies group in the Senate.

On 23 and 24 March 2018, he was Provisional President of the Senate as the most senior senator, during the election of the President of the Senate in the new legislature.

Electoral history

First-past-the-post elections

Presidential elections

Honours

National Honours
 : Head of the Order of Merit of the Italian Republic (15 May 2006 – 14 January 2015)
 : Head of the Military Order of Italy (15 May 2006 – 14 January 2015)
 : Head of the Order of Merit for Labour (15 May 2006 – 14 January 2015)
 : Head of the Order of the Star of Italy reformed from Order of the Star of Italian Solidarity (15 May 2006 – 14 January 2015)
 : Head of the Order of Vittorio Veneto (15 May 2006 – 14 January 2015)
 : Grand Cross of the Order of Merit of the Italian Republic (28 October 1998), Grand Cross with Collar (15 May 2006)

Foreign Honours
 : 1st Class of the Order of Skanderbeg (5 March 2014)
 : Grand Star of the Decoration of Honour for Services to the Republic of Austria (26 June 2007)
 : Collar of the Order of the Southern Cross (10 November 2008)
 : Grand Cross of the Order of the Stara Planina (25 February 2009)
 : Collar of the Order of Merit (15 October 2007)
 : Grand Cross of the Grand Order of King Tomislav (14 July 2011)
 : Grand cross with Collar of the Order of the White Rose (9 September 2008)
 : Grand Cross of the Order of the Legion of Honour (21 November 2012)
 : Grand Cross Special Class of the Order of Merit of the Federal Republic of Germany (28 February 2013)
 : Companion of the Order of the Star of Ghana ( 16 October 2006)
 : Grand cross of the Order of the Redeemer (23 September 2008)
 : Recipient of the Medal in Gold of the Parliament Ellenic (23 September 2008)
  President's Medal (9 June 2014)
 : Knight Grand Cordon with Collar of the Order of al-Hussein bin Ali (20 October 2009)
 : Collar of the Order of Mubarak the Great (3 May 2010)
 : Member Extraordinary Grade of the Order of Merit (30 October 2008)
 : Commander of the Order of Merit (21 April 2004)
 : Knight Grand Cross of the Order of the Gold Lion of the House of Nassau ( 2 February 2009)
 : Honorary Companions of Honour with Collar of the National Order of Merit (30 June 2010)
 : Grand Cross of the Order of the Netherlands Lion ( 23 October 2012)
 : Grand Cross of the Order of the Star of Palestine (17 October 2013)
 : Grand cross of the Order of the White Eagle (11 June 2012)
 : Collar of the Collar of the Independence (13 November 2007)
 : Collar of the Order of the Star of Romania (15 September 2011)
 : Collar of the Order of San Marino (13 June 2014)
 : Collar of the Order of King Abdulaziz ( 5 November 2007)
 : Grand Cross of the Order of the White Double Cross ( 27 February 2007)
 : Member of the Order for Exceptional Merits (17 January 2011)
 : Recipient of the Grand Order of Mugunghwa (14 September 2009)
 : Collar of the Order pro Merito Melitensi (6 November 2008)
 :  Grand Cross of the Order of Isabella the Catholic (26 September 1998)
 : Knight of the Royal Order of the Seraphim (13 March 2009)
 : Member 1st Class of the Order of Umayyad (18 March 2010)
 : First Class of the Order of the State of Republic of Turkey (26 November 2009)
 : Knight with the Collar Order of Pius IX (November 2006)
 Dan David Prize: To Mr. Giorgio Napolitano, President of the Italian Republic, for his dedication to the cause of Parliamentary democracy, thereby contributing to a strengthening of democratic values and institutions in Italy and Europe; and for his courage and intellectual integrity which have been crucial in healing the wounds of the Cold War in Europe, as well as the scars left in Italy in the wake of fascism.
Napolitano received Medaglia Teresiana at University of Pavia in 2009.

References

External links 

 
 

|-

|-

|-

|-

1925 births
Living people
Politicians from Naples
Italian Communist Party politicians
Democratic Party of the Left politicians
Democrats of the Left politicians
Presidents of Italy
Italian Ministers of the Interior
Presidents of the Chamber of Deputies (Italy)
Deputies of Legislature II of Italy
Deputies of Legislature III of Italy
Deputies of Legislature V of Italy
Deputies of Legislature VI of Italy
Deputies of Legislature VII of Italy
Deputies of Legislature VIII of Italy
Deputies of Legislature IX of Italy
Deputies of Legislature X of Italy
Deputies of Legislature XI of Italy
Deputies of Legislature XII of Italy
Senators of Legislature XIV of Italy
Senators of Legislature XV of Italy
Italian life senators
MEPs for Italy 1989–1994
University of Naples Federico II alumni
Italian anti-fascists
Italian resistance movement members
Knights Grand Cross with Collar of the Order of Merit of the Italian Republic
Knights of the Order of Pope Pius IX
Recipients of the Presidential Medal of Distinction of Israel
Recipients of the Order pro Merito Melitensi
First Class of the Order of the Star of Romania